The Clean Energy Regulator is an Australian independent statutory authority responsible for implementing legislation to reduce carbon emissions and increase the use of clean energy. Based in Canberra, Australia, the Clean Energy Regulator was established on 2 April 2012 under the Clean Energy Regulator Act 2011. The agency is part of the Climate Change, Energy, the Environment and Water portfolio.

The responsibilities of the Clean Energy Regulator include:

 administering schemes aimed at managing, reducing and offsetting Australia’s carbon emissions
 monitoring, facilitating and enforcing compliance with each scheme
 collecting, analysing, assessing, providing and publishing information and data
 accrediting auditors for the schemes we administer
 working with other law enforcement and regulatory bodies.

Schemes 
The Clean Energy Regulator administers schemes legislated by the Australian Government for measuring, managing, reducing or offsetting Australia's carbon emissions.

Our schemes are established under legislation as follows:

 National Greenhouse and Energy Reporting scheme and the safeguard mechanism, under the National Greenhouse and Energy Reporting Act 2007
 Emissions Reduction Fund, under the Carbon Credits (Carbon Farming Initiative) Act 2011
 Renewable Energy Target, under the Renewable Energy (Electricity) Act 2000
 Australian National Registry of Emissions Units, under the Australian National Registry of Emissions Units Act 2011.

Reporting 
The Clean Energy Regulator’s Quarterly Carbon Market Reports provide a regular view of supply and demand across the carbon markets schemes we administer and explores key factors that influence market performance. The report also provides information on trends and opportunities that may inform market decisions.

The Clean Energy Regulator also administers the Corporate Emissions Reduction Transparency (CERT) report. The CERT report is a voluntary initiative that provides companies with a consistent framework for reporting their emissions reduction and renewable electricity commitments.

See also

List of Australian Commonwealth Government entities
Mitigation of global warming in Australia
Australian Renewable Energy Agency

References

2012 establishments in Australia
Climate change organisations based in Australia
Commonwealth Government agencies of Australia
Government agencies established in 2012
Energy regulatory authorities
Regulatory authorities of Australia